The Hellenic Air Force (HAF; , sometimes abbreviated as ΠΑ) is the air force of Greece (Hellenic being the synonym for Greek in the Greek language). It is considered to be one of the largest air forces in NATO and is globally placed 18th out of 139 countries. It is also noted for its high quality pilots, benchmarked annually in international exercises. Under the Kingdom of Greece from 1935 to 1973, it was known as the Royal Hellenic Air Force (RHAF).

The Hellenic Air Force is one of the three branches of the Hellenic Armed Forces, and its mission is to guard and protect Greek airspace, provide air assistance and support to the Hellenic Army and the Hellenic Navy and to provide humanitarian aid in Greece and around the world. The Hellenic Air Force includes approximately 33,000 active troops, of whom 11,750 are career officers, 14,000 are professional soldiers (ΕΠ.ΟΠ.), 7,250 are volunteer conscripts and 1,100 are women. The motto of the Hellenic Air Force is the ancient Greek phrase  ("Always Dominate the Heights"), and the HAF emblem represents a flying eagle in front of the Hellenic Air Force roundel. The General Air Staff (GEA) is based at the Papagou Camp in the Municipality of Filothei - Psychiko of the Prefecture of Attica.

History

Origins

In 1911, the Greek Government appointed French specialists to form the Hellenic Aviation Service. Six Greek officers were sent to France for training, while the first four Farman type aircraft were ordered. All six graduated from the Farman school in Étampes near Paris, but only four subsequently served in aviation. The first Greek civilian aviator that was given military rank was Emmanuel Argyropoulos, who flew in a Nieuport IV.G. "Alkyon" aircraft, on February 8, 1912. The first military flight was made on May 13, 1912, by Lieutenant Dimitrios Kamberos. In September of the same year the Greek Army fielded its first squadron, the "Aviators Company" (Greek: Λόχος Αεροπόρων).

Balkan Wars and aftermath (1912–1930)

On October 5, 1912, Kamberos flew the first combat mission, a reconnaissance flight over Thessaly. This was on the first day of the Balkan wars. On the same day a similar mission was flown by German mercenaries in Ottoman service, over the Thrace front against the Bulgarian Army. The Greek and the Ottoman missions, coincidentally flown on the same day, were the first military aviation missions in the history of conventional war. As a matter of fact, all Balkan countries used military aircraft and foreign mercenaries during the Balkan Wars.

January 24, 1913, saw the first naval co-operation mission in history, which took place over the Dardanelles. Aided by the Royal Hellenic Navy destroyer RHNS , 1st Lieutenant Michael Moutoussis and Ensign Aristeidis Moraitinis flew the Farman hydroplane and drew up a diagram of the positions of the Turkish fleet, against which they dropped four bombs. This was not the first air-to-ground attack in military history, as there was a precedent in the Turkish-Italian war of 1911, but the first recorded attack against ships from the air.

Initially, the Hellenic Army and the Royal Hellenic Navy operated separate Army Aviation and Naval Aviation units. During the Balkan Wars, various French Henry and Maurice Farman aircraft types were used. The Hellenic Naval Air Service was officially founded in 1914 by the then Commander in Chief (CnC) of the Royal Hellenic Navy, British Admiral Mark Kerr. Greek aviation units participated in World War I and the Asia Minor Campaign, equipped by the Allies with a variety of French and British designs.

Foundation, World War II and Civil War (1930–1950)

In 1930 the Aviation Ministry was founded, establishing the Air Force as the third branch of the Hellenic Armed Forces. The Hellenic Army Air Service and Hellenic Naval Air Service were merged into a single service, the Royal Hellenic Air Force. In 1931 the Hellenic Air Force Academy, the Icarus School (Greek: Σχολή Ικάρων), was founded.

In 1939, an order for 24 Marcel Bloch MB.151 fighter aircraft was placed, but only 9 of the aircraft reached Greece, since the outbreak of World War II prevented the French from completing the order. The aircraft entered service in the 24th Pursuit Squadron (MD – Moira Dioxis) of the Air Force.

During the Italian invasion of Greece (1940) in the Second World War, although being severely outnumbered and counting only 79 aircraft against 380 fighters and bombers of the Italian Regia Aeronautica, RHAF managed to successfully resist the assault. On October 30, two days after the start of the war, there was the first air battle. Some Henschel Hs126s of 3/2 Flight of 3 Observation Mira took off to locate Italian Army columns. But they were intercepted and attacked by Fiat CR.42 Falcos of 393a Squadriglia. A first Henschel was hit and crashed, killing its observer, Pilot Officer Evanghelos Giannaris, the first Greek aviator to die in the war. A second Hs 126 was downed over Mount Smolikas, killing Pilot Officer Lazaros Papamichail and Sergeant Constantine Yemenetzis. On November 2, 1940, a Breguet 19 intercepted the 3 Alpine Division Julia while it was penetrating the Pindos mountain range in an attempt to occupy Metsovo. On the same day, 2nd Lieutenant Marinos Mitralexis having run out of ammunition, aimed the nose of his PZL P.24 right into the tail of an enemy Cant Z1007bis bomber, smashing the rudder and sending the aircraft out of control.

After 65 days of war the RHAF had lost 31 officers, 7 wounded, plus 4 NCOs killed and 5 wounded. Meanwhile, the number of combat aircraft had dropped to 28 fighters and 7 battleworthy bombers. Still by March 1941, the Italian invasion on air and ground had been successfully pushed back, aided by the vital contribution of the RHAF to the Greek victory. During the Greco-Italian War the Hellenic Air Force shot down 68 enemy aircraft (official records) and claimed another 24. The British RAF claimed 150 additional air victories against Italian aircraft. However, the Italian Air Force recorded only 65 aircraft lost, during the entire campaign against the Greeks and later the British, with 495 additional aircraft reported as damaged.

In April 1941, the German Wehrmacht invaded Greece in order to assist the Italian assault. During this second wave of foreign invasion, the Luftwaffe eventually succeeded in destroying almost the entire Hellenic Air Force. However, some aircraft managed to escape to the Middle East, including 5 Avro Anson, 1 Dornier Do 22, 1 Arado 196 and 3 Avro 626.

During the German occupation of Greece, the Air Force was rebuilt under the expatriated Greek Air Force Ministry based in Cairo. Three squadrons were built, operating under the command of the British RAF. These squadrons were the 13th Light Bombing Squadron flying Avro Ansons, Bristol Blenheims and Martin Baltimores and the 335 and 336 Fighting Squadrons flying Hawker Hurricane I and IIs and Spitfire V types. The RHAF squadrons in the Middle East flew a variety of missions, including convoy patrols, antisubmarine search, offensive patrols, reconnaissance, attack and interception of enemy aircraft. In Summer 1943, the Greek squadrons participated in the attack against the German Wehrmacht on the island of Crete and then from May to November 1944 in Italy. During those years, 70 Greek pilots were lost.

During World War II, Greek pilots who were flying with the RAF achieved many victories. Rhodesian-born Wing Commander John Agorastos Plagis shot down 16 enemy aircraft over Malta and Western Europe. Lieutenant Vasilios Michael Vassiliadis was credited with 11.5 enemy aircraft over Western Europe before he was killed in action on March 15, 1945, over Germany. Steve Pisanos, an immigrant to the US in 1938, joined an Eagle Squadron of American volunteers in the RAF and fought over Western Europe. He later joined the USAAF and acquired US citizenship and continued to fly with the same squadron, now part of the USAF 4th FG. He had achieved 10 victories with the USAAF by 1944.

After Greece's liberation in 1944, RHAF returned to Greece and subsequently played a decisive role in the Greek Civil War, which lasted until 1950. By then, it was re-equipped with Supermarine Spitfire Mk IX, Spitfire Mk XVI fighters and Curtiss SB2C Helldiver bombers.

Post-war developments (1950–1970)

After the end of the Greek Civil War in November 1950, Greece sent 7 Douglas C-47 Dakota transport aircraft of the 13th Transport Aircraft Squadron to South Korea to assist the United Nations. Greek aircraft operated in Korea until May 1955. Greek pilots flew thousands of missions including air evacuations, personnel transport, intelligence gathering, and supply flights. In 1952 Greece joined NATO and the Air Force was rebuilt and organized according to NATO standards. New aircraft, including jets, were introduced.

The first jet fighter flown by the RHAF was the Republic F-84G Thunderjet in 1955. It was also flown by the first Air Force aerobatic team 337 SQ "Hellenic Flame" (Greek: Ελληνική Φλόγα). The RF-84F entered service with the 348 Tactical Reconnaissance Squadron in 1956. Although the F-84G was replaced by the Canadair Sabre 2 in 1954 and 1955 after 100 units were retired from the Royal Canadian Air Force and upgraded in the United Kingdom before entering service with the RHAF, the RF-84F remained in service until 1991. The Lockheed T-33 was also delivered as a trainer in 1955. Some RT-33s were used for reconnaissance missions.

In the late 1960s, the RHAF acquired new jet aircraft. These included the Convair F-102 Delta Dagger (in service 1969–1975), the Lockheed F-104G Starfighter and the Northrop F-5 Freedom Fighter. The F-104 and F-5 stayed in service until the mid- to late 1980s.

In the mid-1970s the Hellenic Air Force was further modernized with deliveries of the Dassault Mirage F1CG fleet, the Vought A-7 Corsair II (including a number of TA-7Hs) and the first batch of McDonnell-Douglas F-4 Phantom IIs.

In 1993, the United States Air Force delivered 62 additional A-7Es and TA-7Cs increasing further the air-to-ground capabilities of the HAF. These aircraft remained in service until 2011.

Modernization (1980–1997)

Until the late 1980s the Air Force deployed missiles armed with U.S. nuclear warheads using the LTV TA-7C Corsair II. As a result of Greco-Turkish tension caused by the 1974 Turkish invasion of Cyprus, the U.S. removed its nuclear weapons from Greek and Turkish alert units to storage. Greece saw this as another pro-Turkish move by NATO and withdrew its forces from NATO's military command structure from 1974 to 1980.

In March 1985 the Greek government announced the purchase of 34 F-16C and 6 F-16D Block 30 variant in the "Peace Xenia I" modernisation program. In the same month Greece ordered 36 single-seat Mirage 2000EG and 4 two-seat Mirage 2000BG, as part of the "Talos" modernization program.

Subsequently, in 1989, the first fourth-generation fighters were introduced, marking the beginning of a new era: the first Mirage 2000 EG/BG aircraft were delivered to the 114 Combat Wing in Tanagra airforce base and equipped the 331 and 332 squadrons. In January 1989 the first F-16C/D Block 30 arrived in 111 combat wing in Nea Anchialos airforce base and were allocated to the 330 "Thunder" and 346 "Jason" interceptor squadrons in Larissa airforce base.

On March 29, 1991, the RF-84F were retired from service after 34 years and 7 months of operational life. In November 1992 more RF-4Es were delivered to the 348 "Eyes" Tactical Reconnaissance Squadron.

In 1993 the "Peace Xenia II" modernisation program began. Greece ordered 32 F-16C and 8 F-16D, Block 50 variant. The first Block 50 was delivered on July 25, 1997. These aircraft, equipped with the LANTIRN navigation and targeting pod as well as AIM-120 AMRAAM and AGM-88 HARM missiles, were allocated to the 341 "Arrow" and 347 "Perseus" squadrons in Nea Anchialos airforce base. The basic mission of 341 "Arrow" squadron is Suppression of Enemy Air Defenses (SEAD). The role of 347 "Perseus" squadron is air-to-ground missions.

Entering the 21st century (1998–2007)

In 1998 Greece decided, in collaboration with the German Aerospace Industry (DASA) and the Hellenic Aerospace Industry (HAI/EAB), to upgrade 39 F-4E Phantom II fighters. The first aircraft was delivered at Andravida Air Base in December 2002. This aircraft, which was named "Princess of Andravida" (s/n 72-01523), was unique because it did not have the M61 Vulcan gun installed. All upgraded F-4s were equipped with the new AN/APQ-65YG radar similar to that of the F/A-18 Hornet, a new onboard Mission Control Computer (MCC), a Head Up Display, the IFF Interrogator, Multi Function Displays and were also capable of carrying a variety of advanced Air-to-Air and Air-to-Ground missiles. These included the AIM-120 AMRAAM (although only the -B edition), the AIM-9M missile, the AFDS and the entire family of the Paveway (I, II and III) laser-guided bombs. These aircraft were the F-4E Peace Icarus 2000 (PI2000) or F-4E Phantom II AUP (Avionics Upgrade Program) variants. Although gradual retirement of F-4 units started in 2017, they are still operational in multi-role missions with the 338 Squadron "Ares" and the 339 Squadron "Ajax" based in Andravida Air Force Base. The F-4E Phantom II PI2000 (AUP) has been certified for use of GBU-27 Paveway III laser-guided bombs, making the aircraft an excellent and modern platform for precision strikes.

In 2000, Greece decided to purchase a large number of fighters to replace the remaining non-upgraded F-4E Phantoms, a number of A-7 Corsairs, and the fleet of Mirage F1CGs. An order for 60 F-16 Block 52 Plus was placed. The order was for 50 single-seaters of the C version and 10 two-seaters of the D version.

Until 2001 Greece participated in NATO's "nuclear weapons sharing", using the A-7 Corsair II to deploy tactical B61 nuclear warheads from Araxos Air Force Base. Greece then strategically decided to remove all nuclear weapons under storage in Greece and did not purchase any more aircraft with nuclear mounting capabilities.

In September 2004, Greece also decided to upgrade all of its existing Mirage 2000 to the Mirage 2000-5F Mark 2 (Mk2) standard and place an additional order for 15 new Mirage 2000-5Mk2 aircraft. The project was undertaken by Dassault Aviation and the Hellenic Aerospace Industry (HAI/EAB). The Mirage 2000-5Mk2 has a new and more powerful radar, improved long range Air-to-Ground capabilities which includes the SCALP EG Cruise Missile, a new Self-Protection System (SPS), a new Inertial Navigation System (INS), a Glass Cockpit and the addition of air refuelling capability.

Eventually In 2005, HAF was officially the first air force in the world to add the F-16 Block 52 Plus to its inventory, since the first aircraft were delivered. This advanced F-16 type is an improved version of the Block 50 featuring a more powerful radar, Conformal Fuel Tanks for longer operational range, advanced communication systems, an upgraded engine, Joint Helmet Mounted Cueing System (JHMCS) and is capable of carrying more advanced weapons including the IRIS-T Air To Air missile. Three squadrons are operating with this type of F-16. These squadrons are the 337 Squadron "Ghost" in Larissa air base, the 340 Squadron "Fox" and the 343 Squadron "Star" in Souda air base.

In 2007, the Greek government ordered an additional 30 F-16 fighters, 20 single seaters and 10 double seaters. However this time, the aircraft variant was the F-16C/D Block 52+ Advanced, that had been specifically modified for the Hellenic Air Force and offered as F-16 52M by Lockheed Martin, due to the improved computing power of the onboard mission computer (MMC). The difference between the Block 52+ and the Block 52+ Advanced, is the LINK 16 Communications System of the Advanced version, as well as a more powerful Mission Control Computer, an extra Multi Function Display with a movable map navigation, advanced Debriefing System and the capability to carry the RECCE Reconnaissance Pod. The first aircraft were delivered in May 2009 and fly with the 335 Squadron "Tiger" in Araxos air base.

Later years and Greek Economic Crisis (2007–2018) 
Due to the retirement and obsolescence of units that had concluded their operational cycle (A-7E Corsair II and F-4 Phantom II), HAF was looking forward to acquiring new 4th, 4.5th or 5th generation fighters and at the same time maintain a total number of 300 advanced fighters, also according to the Supreme Air Force Council "2007–2012 operational planning", which was published in 2007. Candidates for the new generation aircraft were the Dassault Rafale, F-35 Lightning II, F/A-18E/F Super Hornet, MiG-35 and the Sukhoi Su-35.

During the Greek economic crisis (2008-2018), budget cuts forced HAF to ground many of its F-16s due to lack of spare parts and maintenance. Eventually in 2015, Greece placed an order for provision of spare parts in support of its F-16, F/RF-4E, C-130H/B, C-27J, T-6A/C, and other aircraft with systems/subsystems of U.S. origin. The estimated cost of this order was $160 million. In addition, some long-awaited programs were rescheduled for the future. The HAF modernization program estimated in 2007 that a purchase of 45 advance training aircraft, 15 SAR helicopters and 40–60 new fighters was necessary. Some of these programs were either postponed, or eventually cancelled.

Developing programs

F-16V
Towards the end of the crisis and immediately after, HAF dedicated resources for the upgrade of the fleet of its existing Mirage 2000 and F-16 fighters. In 2018, Lockheed Martin was contracted to upgrade 84 F-16C/D Block 52+ and Block 52+ Advanced (Block 52M) to the latest F-16C/D Block 70/72 (F-16V Viper) standard, bringing capabilities to the fleet only available in 5th generation fighters such as the F-35 Lightning II. This upgrade was also considered by HAF as an essential first step for future compatibility with the F-35 fighter. While HAF's earlier F-16C/D Block 30 and Block 50 aircraft were not included in the program, they were planned to receive equipment donated from the upgraded platforms. The upgrade program is scheduled to be completed by 2027, and carried out exclusively in Greece by Hellenic Aerospace (HAI). The first 2 aircraft upgraded in the US were delivered on 12 September 2022.

F-35
In April 2019, as part of the selection process for the new HAF 5th generation fighter, Greece selected the Lockheed Martin F-35 as a replacement of its older F-16 Block 30s or F-4 Phantoms and as complementary to the F-16V upgrade program. The timeline for acquisition of the new aircraft, depended mainly on the country's fiscal plans and Washington's ability to offer a long-term payment framework. At the same time, the US Pentagon confirmed Greece as one of 5 countries to be considered as potential new customers.

In January 2020, Greece formally expressed interest in acquiring and participating in the F-35 program, following a visit by Greek Prime Minister Kyriakos Mitsotakis to the White House.  A figure of 20 aircraft was initially floated, to be acquired following successful completion of the upgrading of the Greek F-16 fleet in 2027.

However, reports in September and October 2020, claimed that Greece could receive at least six F-35 jets much earlier, originally built for Turkey before its ouster from the program, after the latter conducted tests of the S-400 missile systems purchased from Russia. In late-October 2020, it was made public that the United States and Greece had further discussed the sale of 18 to 24 F-35 jets to Greece, during U.S. Secretary of State Mike Pompeo's visit to Athens earlier that month. The following month, Greece officially addressed a Letter of Intent (LoI) to the US Pentagon. In that LoI, Greece even showed interest in acquiring used USAF jets, if that meant initial deliveries could be agreed as early as 2021. According to earlier reports from Greek national daily Estia on October 19 however, an optimistic scenario would mean that the first six aircraft could only arrive in Greece by 2022, at the earliest.

On 30 June 2022 Greece's prime minister confirmed that the country has sent a request to the United States for the purchase of 20 F-35s, with the option of buying a second group of jets also being examined. The expected delivery date is 2027–2028.

Rafale
In August 2020, Greece announced the acquisition of eighteen Rafale multirole aircraft from France. Initial reports stated that ten would be the new C-built Rafale F3-R version and eight would be older F1 & F2 versions already in use with the French Air Force, that would be given to Greece free-of-charge. However, later reports stated that all 18 aircraft would be the new F3-R version and would replace an equal number of older Mirage 2000EGM aircraft, that had not been previously upgraded to the 2000-5 Mark II version. Finally In January 2021, the official agreement with Dassault Aviation was ratified in Parliament, and included the purchase of 6 newly built, and 12 slightly used F3-R aircraft in previous service with the Armée de l'Air, for a total cost of €2.4 billion, including their armament and ground support. Theodoros Lagios, Director General of Armament and Investments of the Greek Ministry of Defence (MoD), and Éric Trappier, chairman and CEO of Dassault Aviation, signed the contracts in Athens on 25 January.

In June 2021, Dassault Aviation released the first photographs of Rafale F3R of the Hellenic Air Force, bearing the HAF roundel and fin flash, and in July the first aircraft was officially delivered to Greece. The aircraft were commissioned to the 332 "Falcon" All-Weather Squadron, previously operating with Mirage 2000EGM/BGM jets.

On 11 September 2021, Greek Prime Minister at the 2021 Thessaloniki International Fair announced the purchase of 6 additional Rafale, bringing the total order number to 24. Greece officially signs new contract for the acquisition of six additional new Rafale aircraft on 24 March 2022, which follows Greece's acquisition of Rafales in January 2021 and increased number of Rafales to be operated to 24 aircraft.

Unmanned aerial vehicles (UAVs)
In 2019, Greece reached an agreement with Israel for the lease, with an option to purchase, of 2+1 IAI Heron unmanned aerial vehicles. These aircraft would be utilised by HAF and the Hellenic Navy in land and marine border patrol missions. Greek Herons include a unique maritime configuration with sensors and communications designed to monitor the extensive water borders of Greece.

In addition, in November 2020, the Greek multinational company Intracom Defense Electronics (IDE) was placed head of a consortium that included the Aristotle University of Thessaloniki (AUT), the University of Patras, as well as many other Greek and European companies from Cyprus, Spain and the Netherlands, for the design and construction of stealth swarm drones, codenamed Project LOTUS (Low Observable Tactical Unmanned System). It was noted that two types of drones will be built as part of Project Lotus. The first will be the "mothership", a large drone with stealth characteristics, to be designed by the AUT based on the Delaer-RX3 prototype designed by the university's Laboratory of Fluid Mechanics and Turbomachinery (LFMT). The rest will be smaller swarm drones built in large numbers, linked to, and supported by the mothership. These endogenous aircraft will be primarily used in border and maritime patrol missions, high value target reconnaissance and surveillance, while utilising data-fusion technologies to cooperate with HAF's future 4.5 and 5th generation fighters. According to IDE, the Air Force could completely cover its operational needs within a 5-year plan. On 9 June 2021, the Hellenic MOD approved the project for development, as part of 16 other multinational and European projects that were examined and approved by MOD technical staff.

In July 2022 the Hellenic Air Force signed a deal with General Atomics to obtain three General Atomics MQ-9C Sea Guardian UAV's. These will enhance the maritime surveillance capability of the Air Force as each aircraft can remain in the air for forty hours.

Turkish drones frequently violate Greek airspace and they can overwhelm Greek air defences. It is difficult for the likes of a Greek F16 to engage a Baykar Bayraktar TB2 if it enters Greek airspace four times a day. For this reason Rafael Advanced Defense Systems of Israel is providing the Drone Dome, a system of electronic devices. These can disrupt the communications and GPS signals of the TB2. This can deny Greek airspace to Turkish drones in the event of a war and even eliminate them with a 10 kW laser.

The defence firm Hellenic Aerospace Industry unveiled the new Archytas UAV at the Thessaloniki International Fair in September 2022. This is a fixed-wing UAV in a pusher configuration, with four additional motors to allow the aircraft to take-off and land vertically. Archytas is primarily designed for surveillance by the Armed Forces. However, it can also be used by civil defence agencies and can be armed with up to 14 kg of weapons. It has a range of 300 km, a top speed of 120kmph and a four-hour flight endurance.

It has been announced that the first Greek UCAV is under development. It will be called Grypas. The project is lead by EAB with the collaboration of several universities such as the Democritus University of Thrace. Large scale production is expected to start in 2025.

Regional role

Turkey
In international politics, the antagonism between Greece and Turkey has made it imperative for HAF to maintain parity with TAF. HAF and TAF pilots have engaged in mock dogfights over the Aegean sea for years, with some turning deadly such as the 1996 shooting down of a Turkish F-16 by a Greek Mirage 2000 and the 2006 crash between a Greek F-16 and a Turkish F-16.

The regional balance of power in the eastern Mediterranean was inevitably affected during the Greek government-debt crisis. However, it was subsequently restored, influenced by negative developments in Turkey's F-35 program in 2019, rise of diplomatic tensions in Turkey-US bilateral relations during the same period, and at the same time, the decision of Greece to direct funds towards the upgrade of its existing F-16 and Mirage 2000 fleet, and eventually to acquire new 4.5 generation fighters in 2020.

Cyprus
HAF is also responsible for the defence of Cypriot airspace as Cyprus Air Command has no combat jet capabilities. HAF aircraft have to be able to reach the island and remain over Cypriot airspace for prolonged periods of time and possibly under combat conditions. The distance between the nearest Greek air base on the island of Crete and Cyprus is about 700 km. Furthermore, the Air Force seeks to have the ability to strike at distances of more than 1,000 km from its bases. To that effect in September 2020, during increased tensions between Greece and Turkey in the Eastern Mediterranean amidst Turkish attempts to conduct hydrocarbon exploration in disputed waters, Greek F-16 fighter jets taking off from Crete reached and landed, undetected, on the island of Cyprus for the first time in almost 20 years, participating in joint drills together with Cyprus and France and successfully returning to their home base after.

The Balkans
In May 2019, the defence ministers of Greece and North Macedonia signed a military agreement, for the policing and patrolling of North Macedonia's airspace by Greece. The agreement also included other areas such as military technology, cybersecurity, intelligence and air traffic control, all provided by the Hellenic Air Force. Since 2017 Greece and Italy also provide, in rotation, policing of the airspaces of Albania and Montenegro. Additionally, as part of Greece's conventional obligations within NATO, HAF and USAF aircraft cooperate in a variety of missions, from air patrolling, to ground target marking, and provision of air defence training to allied Balkan countries.

North Africa and Persian Gulf
As part of multilateral arrangements, Greece remains in close military cooperation with countries of the Eastern Mediterranean region and the Persian Gulf, including Israel, Egypt, Jordan, the UAE and Saudi Arabia. On 14 September 2021, the Hellenic Air Force deployed a fully equipped battery of MIM-104 Patriot missiles to Saudi Arabia as part of the Integrated Air and Missile Defense Concept. According to official statements, Athens and Riyadh had agreed on the deployment of the Hellenic Force of Saudi Arabia (HFSA) consisting of the MIM-104 Patriot System and 120 men with their relevant gear and infrastructure for an unspecified length of time, to guard "critical energy infrastructures".

In September 2020, Greece and the UAE conducted common air superiority drills in the Eastern Mediterranean region, that lasted almost 3 weeks. As the two air forces share very similar types of fleets, and following these common exercises, the two countries signed a mutual defence agreement further reinforcing bilateral military and political ties.

In December 2020, Greece and Israel came closer to a €1.4 billion agreement over 20 years, for the creation of the International Air Force Training Center (IAFTC) in the Greek city of Kalamata. The IAFTC will provide advanced training to new Greek and Israeli military pilots, as well as lease services to international Air Force customers, utilising the Alenia Aermacchi M-346 Master jet trainer that will replace the North American T-2 Buckeye. The main Israeli company committed to the investment is Elbit Systems. The International Air Force Training Center (IAFTC) officially opened in October 2022 with fourteen Beechcraft T-6 single-engine turboprop aircraft, with M-346 and additional T-6 to join in the near future.

Organization

Personnel

Ranks

Officer ranks

Other ranks

Equipment

Aircraft

Retired
Previous notable aircraft operated were the Supermarine Spitfire, F-86 Sabre, Douglas C-47 Skytrain, Grumman HU-16 Albatross, Sikorsky H-19, Bell 47, Dassault Mirage F1, Lockheed T-33, Republic F-84F, Convair F-102 Delta Dagger, Lockheed F-104 Starfighter, Northrop F-5, A-7 Corsair II, and the RF-4E

Air Defense

Aircraft markings and camouflage 
The primary camouflage scheme utilized by the Hellenic Air Force is the Aegean Ghost scheme. This is modified slightly for each aircraft type but is standard for all combat and transport aircraft in the inventory. Some training, search-and-rescue, and firefighting aircraft are colored partially or completely in high-visibility colors for identification and easier location in case of an accident. The air force also frequently uses colorful commemorative schemes to mark anniversaries and other special occasions or for display purposes. National markings are applied to all aircraft, with the national roundel consisting of concentric blue, white, and blue rings displayed on the fuselage sides and wing surfaces and a tricolor fin flash of similar blue, white, and blue horizontal stripes on the rudder. The words Πολεμική Αεροπορία (or simply the abbreviation ΠΑ) are applied to the fuselage as well, although this is less common in current schemes. Aircraft in Aegean Ghost scheme may have low visibility markings applied in which blue is replaced by dark grey and white by light grey.

Originally, many aircraft in service retained the basic color scheme they were acquired in. Prior to World War II, combat aircraft were given a green and brown top scheme with white or sky blue underside, similar to the Royal Air Force. After the war, jet fighter aircraft such as the Sabre and Starfighter would serve in a polished metal scheme. Later, most aircraft received green and brown camouflage again, consistent with the United States Air Force's South East Asia scheme, referred to as Vietnam camouflage in Greece. A-7 Corsair IIs would be some of the last aircraft to fly with this scheme, retaining it until their retirement, long after all-over grey schemes had become the normal application for Greek aircraft. C-130 Hercules transports which were used in southeast Asia early in their careers were repainted in an overall grey theme.

Aircraft accidents and incidents

The worst accident in the history of the Hellenic Air Force occurred on February 5, 1991, when Lockheed C-130H Hercules s/n 748 crashed into Mount Othrys during the landing approach to Nea Anchialos. Sixty-three people were killed.

On the 30th of January 2023, a Hellenic Air Force upgraded two-seated F-4E Phantom crashed in the Ionian sea at around 10:30 am, 25 nautical miles (46,3 Km) south of Andravida air base. The aircraft belonged to the 338th Fighter-Bomber Squadron of the117th Combat Wing based in Andravida. The accident occured during a training exercise with another F-4E that successfully retairned to base, the aircraft that crashed was the No.2 of the flight formation. According to early sources, shortly before the crash the two pilots sent a distress signal that they would abandon the aircraft and use the ejection seats, later it was indicated that none of the pilots ejected from the aircraft. A large search and rescue operation involving helicopters and ships from the Hellenic Air Force, the Hellenic Navy and the Hellenic coast quard was set to find and rescue the pilots. The co-pilot has been confirmed killed, while the captain was declared dead a few days later. It is still unclear what caused the crash but some speculate that it is due to a technical failure.

See also 
 List of flying aces from Greece
 Hellenic Air Force Academy
 Hellenic Aerospace Industry
 Sedes Air Base
 Kavala AirSea Show
 Hellenic Air Force Museum

Notes

References

Bibliography

Further reading
 George J. Beldecos et al. Hellenic Wings: An Illustrated History of the Hellenic Air Force and its Precursors - 1908–1944, pub. Air Historical Branch (HAF), 1st edition (1999)
 A. Tsagaratos (Editor): Hellenic Air Force Yearbook 2010/B, Special Projects, Athens, Greece, ISSN 1790-4102 (2011). Page 8 contains a summary Order of Battle and a summary aircraft inventory, as of December 2010.
 "World Military Aircraft Inventory", Aerospace Source Book 2007, Aviation Week & Space Technology, January 15, 2007
 The Library of Congress Country Studies, CIA World Factbook
 Greece – The Hellenic Air Force
 
 Aircraft Inventory (Greek)

External links

 Hellenic Air Force Official Website
 Ministry of National Defence Website

 
Military units and formations established in 1930
1930 establishments in Greece